H40 may refer to:
 H-40 (Michigan county highway) 
 H-40 (keelboat) a sailing yacht designed by Hans Groop
 H40 (Long Island bus)
 Glaucoma
 , a Royal Navy A-class destroyer
 Hoffmann H40, a German prototype sports plane